Llandeilo Llwydarth or Llandilo is an ancient area and parish in the Preseli Hills between Llangolman and Maenclochog in the community of Maenclochog, Pembrokeshire, Wales.

History
The area is rich in prehistoric and early Christian remains, and evidence of more recent activity such as quarrying and defence. In the south of the parish is Temple Druid, a Grade II and Grade II* complex of listed buildings. Llandilo is listed as an historic place name by the Royal Commission RCAHMW.

In 1450 the Bishop of ST Davids John de la Bere agreed to renounce his rights to lands held by Henry Perrot keeper of the Forest of Llwydarth.

The forest of Llwydarth covered some 300 acres in the fourteenth century but by the late sixteenth century it had all but disappeared.

Llandilo has a Welsh Independent chapel, built in 1714, subsequently restored several times, and in use in 2020.

Slate of roofing quality was quarried in the 19th century.

Parish
The parish of Llandilo was in the ancient hundred of Cemais.  Early in the 19th century the population was 117, and the parish was partly enclosed and part mountainous. Its northern end includes the highest peak in the Preselis, Foel Cwmcerwyn. The parish is combined with Llangolman under the Diocese of St Davids.

The parish church is dedicated to Saint Teilo and the church and parish is associated with holy wells, pre-Christian enclosures and early Christian stones and inscriptions. Extracts from the Coflein online record for the church read: 

The skull is kept in the south chapel of Llandaff Cathedral in Cardiff.

Governance
In 1973, the parish Llandilo became part of Haverfordwest Registration District and the following year it became a community with the name of Llandeilo Llwydarth, then in Dyfed, where it remained until 1996, when Pembrokeshire was reinstated as a county of Wales, at which time Llandeilo Llwydarth ceased to be a community.

References

Further reading
The Archaeology of the Early Medieval Celtic Churches: No. 29 by Nancy Edwards, 2017 (Routledge)

External links

A Vision of Britain through Time

Districts of Pembrokeshire
History of Pembrokeshire